Alastair J. Minnis (born 1948) is a Northern Irish literary critic and historian of ideas who has written extensively about medieval literature, and contributed substantially to the study of late-medieval theology and philosophy. Having gained a first-class B.A. degree at the Queen's University of Belfast, he matriculated at Keble College, Oxford as a visiting graduate student, where he completed work on his Belfast Ph.D. (awarded 1975), having been mentored by M.B. Parkes and Beryl Smalley. Following appointments at the Queen's University of Belfast (Lecturer, 1972–81) and Bristol University (Lecturer, later Reader, 1981–87), he was appointed Professor of Medieval Literature at the University of York; also Director of the Centre for Medieval Studies and later Head of English & Related Literature. From 2003 to 2006, he was a Humanities Distinguished Professor at Ohio State University, Columbus, from where he moved to Yale University. In 2008, he was named Douglas Tracy Smith Professor of English at Yale. He retired in 2018, and is now living in the Scottish Borders. Professor Minnis is a Fellow of the English Association, UK (2000), a Fellow of the Medieval Academy of America (2001), and an Honorary Member of the Royal Irish Academy (2016). From 2012 to 2014, he served as president of the New Chaucer Society. Currently, he is Vice-President of the John Gower Society. He was General Editor of the Cambridge University Press series Cambridge Studies in Medieval Literature from 1987 to 2018, and holds an honorary master's degree from Yale (2007) and an honorary doctorate from the University of York (2018). The University of York also bestowed on him the honorific title of Emeritus Professor of Medieval Literature (2018).

Selected publications

Major books and edited collections
 Chaucer and Pagan Antiquity (Woodbridge: Boydell and Brewer, 1982). 200 pages.
["As a recreation of fourteenth-century historical awareness this book does something new and important. The argument throughout is reinforced by Minnis's thorough knowledge of late medieval thought and commentary... Minnis offers the best account I have read of the functions of Troilus's soliloquy on necessity and Theseus's First Mover speech ...'. Speculum]
 (ed.) Gower's Confessio amantis: Responses and Reassessments (Cambridge: D.S. Brewer, 1983). 202 pages.
 Medieval Theory of Authorship: Scholastic Literary Attitudes in the Later Middle Ages (London: Scolar Press, 1984). Revised editions 1988, 2009. 323 pages.
['No professional medievalist with a serious interest in literature can afford to leave this book unread'. British Book News ]
 (ed.) The Medieval Boethius: Studies in the Vernacular Translations of 'De Consolatione  Philosophiae''' (Woodbridge: Boydell and Brewer, 1987). 197 pages.
 (with A.B. Scott, ed.), Medieval Literary Theory and Criticism c.1100 c.1375: The Commentary Tradition (Oxford: Clarendon Press, 1988). 538 pages. Revised ed. 1991.
['Superbly executed, this is an extremely impressive and important book for medievalists, literary critics, theorists and cultural historians alike. It will be a standard work for a long time'. Times Higher Education Supplement]
 (ed.) Latin and Vernacular: Studies in Late-Medieval Texts and Manuscripts, York Manuscripts Conferences: Proceedings Series, 1 (Cambridge & Woodbridge: Boydell and Brewer, 1989). 190 pages.
 Chaucer's Shorter Poems. [Includes contributions by V.J. Scattergood and J.J. Smith.] (Oxford: Clarendon Press, 1995). 578 pages
['Minnis is the best equipped of all British medievalists for this Borgesian task. His extraordinary wide reading in both critical and contextual materials is in evidence throughout the book.  ... Minnis's open engagement with recent political criticism is to be commended ...'.  Times Literary Supplement]
 (ed., with C. C. Morse and T. Turville-Petre), Essays on Ricardian Literature in Honour of J.A. Burrow (Oxford: Clarendon Press, 1997). 358 pages.
 (ed., with Peter Biller), Medieval Theology and the Natural Body, York Studies in Medieval Theology I (York: York Medieval Press in association with Boydell and Brewer, 1997). 244 pages.
 (ed., with Peter Biller), Handling Sin: Confession in Late-Medieval Culture, York Studies in Medieval Theology II (York: York Medieval Press, in association with Boydell and Brewer, 1998). 219 pages.
 (ed., with Tim William Machan), The Sources of Chaucer’s ‘Boece’ (Athens and London: University of Georgia Press, 2005).
 Magister Amoris: The ‘Roman de la Rose’ and Vernacular Hermeneutics (Oxford: Oxford University Press, 2001). 352 pages. A Kindle edition was issued in 2011.
['I have not seen an equally persuasive and textually supported account of this encyclopedic narrative. There is no better and more stimulating introduction to one of the most controversial and influential vernacular texts of the European Middle Ages'. Archiv]
 (ed., with Ian Johnson), The Cambridge History of Literary Criticism, vol. 2: The Middle Ages (Cambridge: Cambridge University Press, 2005).  866 pages. [An Arabic language translation was subsequently published]
 (ed., with Jane Roberts), Text, Image, Interpretation: Studies in Anglo-Saxon Literature and its Insular Context in Honour of Éamonn Ó Carragáin (Turnhout: Brepols, 2007).
 Fallible Authors: Chaucer’s Pardoner and Wife of Bath (Philadelphia: University of Pennsylvania Press, 2007). Monograph of 520 pages.
['a witty and immensely informative study'. Speculum]
 Translations of Authority in Medieval English Literature: Valuing the Vernacular (Cambridge: Cambridge University Press, 2009). Monograph of 272 pages.
['Minnis slaloms down the steep slopes of scholastic theology with virtuosic ease and rapidity ... an impressive book that anyone interested in arguments about vernacular theology and English orthodoxy, or anyone interested in how Alastair Minnis continues to write so well and so much, will want to read'. Notes and Queries]
 (ed., with Rosalynn Voaden),  Medieval Holy Women in the Christian Tradition, c.1100–c.1500 (Brepols, Turnhout, 2010). A reference book of 748 pages.
 (ed., with Stephen Rigby). Historians on Chaucer: The General Prologue to the Canterbury Tales (Oxford: Oxford University Press, 2014). 503 pages.
 The Cambridge Introduction to Chaucer (Cambridge: Cambridge University Press, 2014).
['[this book] conveys a continuing enjoyment and delight in reading and interpreting Chaucer's writings. By mixing the experience of a lengthy teaching career with the authority of his widely admired scholarship, Minnis encourages us to pause, observe, take stock, and share the wonders and conundrums of Chaucer's achievement. We are in the hands of an expert guide who knows his own mind  ...'. Speculum]
 From Eden to Eternity: Creations of Paradise in the Later Middle Ages. A monograph of 392 pages with 32 color illus. (Philadelphia: University of Pennsylvania Press, 2015).
['Like all of Minnis's work, it is impressively learned and couched in fluent and charming prose. . . . To read the book through, moreover, is to receive not only a thorough review of medieval ideas about Paradise but an excellent introduction to medieval scholasticism. . . . In addition to his remarkable learning, Minnis is a fine literary critic, and I know no other medievalist capable of presenting work so learned with his deftness and subtlety'. The Journal of English and Germanic Philology]
 Hellish Imaginations from Augustine to Dante: An Essay in Metaphor and Materiality, Medium Ævum Monographs n.s. 37 (Oxford: The Society for the Study of Medieval Languages and Literature, 2020).
 Phantom Pains and Prosthetic Narratives: From George Dedlow to Dante, Cambridge Elements in Histories of Emotions and the Senses (Cambridge: Cambridge University Press, 2021).

Contributions to books (since 2015)
 "Unquiet Graves: Pearl and the Hope of Reunion", in Truth and Tales: Cultural Mobility and Medieval Media, ed. Nicholas Watson & Fiona Somerset (Columbus: Ohio State University Press, 2015), pp. 117–34.
 "Discourse beyond death: The Language of Heaven in the Middle English Pearl", in Language in Medieval Britain: Networks and Exchanges, ed. by Mary Carruthers, Harlaxton Medieval Studies, 25 (Shaun Tyas: Donington, 2015), pp. 214–28.
 "Reconciling amour and yconomique: Evrart de Conty's Ambition as Vernacular Commentator", in Traduire au XIVe siècle : Evrart de Conty et la vie intellectuelle à la cour de Charles V, ed. by Joëlle Ducos and Michèle Goyens (Éditions Honoré Champion: 2015), pp. 199–222.
 "Other Worlds: Chaucer's Classicism", in The Oxford History of Classical Reception in English Literature, Volume 1: 800-1558, ed. by Rita Copeland (Oxford: Oxford University Press, 2016), pp. 413–434.
 "Figuring the letter: Making sense of sensus litteralis in late-medieval Christian Exegesis", in Interpreting Scriptures in Judaism, Christianity and Islam: Overlapping Inquiries, ed. Mordechai Z. Cohen and Adele Berlin (Cambridge: Cambridge University Press, 2016), pp. 159–182. (The outcome of work by a research group based at the Institute of Advanced Studies in Jerusalem.)
 "The Prick of Conscience and the Imagination of Paradise", in: Pursuing Middle English Manuscripts and their Texts. Essays in Honour of Ralph Hanna, edited by Simon Horobin and Aditi Nafde (Turnhout: Brepols, 2016), pp. 127–40.
 "Secularity", in Geoffrey Chaucer in Context, ed. by Ian Johnson (Cambridge: Cambridge University Press, 2019), pp. 178–86, 453-54.

Periodical articles (since 2010)
 "Image Trouble in Vernacular Commentary: The Vacillations of Francesco da Barberino", in Inventing a Path: Studies in Medieval Rhetoric in Honour of Mary Carruthers, ed. Laura Iseppi de Filippis; a special issue of Nottingham Medieval Studies, 56 (2012, actually published 2013), 229-245.
 "Chaucer Drinks What He Brews: The House of Fame, 1873-82", Notes and Queries, 16 April (2014).
 "The Restoration of All Things: John Bradford's Refutation of Aquinas on Animal Resurrection", The Journal of Medieval and Early Modern Studies, 45.2 (2015), pp. 323–42.
 "Fragmentations of Medieval Religion: Thomas More, Chaucer, and the Volcano Lover", Studies in the Age of Chaucer, 37 (2015), pp. 3–27. [The 2014 Presidential Address to the New Chaucer Society]
 "Aggressive Chaucer: Of dolls, drink and Dante", The Medieval Translator, 16 (2016), 357-76. Edited by Pieter de Leemans and Michele Goyens.
 "Bending Augustine's nose. Or How to Authorize Sexual Pleasure", The Medieval Journal'', 8.2 (2018), 1–20.

References

External links
 Alastair Minnis at Yale University website

Living people
Yale University faculty
Fellows of the English Association
1948 births